Farasan may refer to:
 Farasan Islands - archipelago in the Red Sea
 Farasan Island - largest island of the archipelago
 Farasan - largest city of the archipelago